The Stone of the Goats (Galician: Pedra das Cabras) is a petroglyph located in a pine forest near the village of Figueirido (civil parish of Palmeira, municipality of Ribeira), in the Barbanza Region of Galicia.

Description 
The zoomorphic motifs are scratched into the side of a large solitary rock and depict two animals, possibly deer. Each animal has six legs, which might have been a deliberate choice to represent movement in the figures. The engravings have been tentatively dated to the Neolithic.

Image gallery

Notes

References
 

Petroglyphs
Archaeological sites in Galicia (Spain)